Anepsion maritatum is a species of spider of the genus Anepsion. It is found in India, Sri Lanka, China to Sulawesi.

See also 
 List of Araneidae species

References

External links
Integrated Taxonomic Information
ncbi

Spiders of Asia
Spiders described in 1877